Stendardo is an Italian surname. Notable people with the surname include:

 Guglielmo Stendardo (born 1981), Italian footballer
 Mariano Stendardo (born 1983), Italian footballer

Italian-language surnames